Dara Coleman (born 4 December 1972 in Belfast, Northern Ireland) is an Irish actor known for playing the redcoat sergeant defying Mel Gibson in the 2000 movie The Patriot.

Career
Coleman's film credits include World Trade Center, Newlyweds, Brother to Brother, Ash Wednesday and The Fitzgerald Family Christmas.

He has also appeared on Broadway in The Playboy of the Western World.

Filmography

References

External links
http://m.imdb.com/name/nm0170995

Living people
1972 births
Male actors from Belfast
Irish male film actors
Irish male television actors
Irish male voice actors